Plaza Dilao is a public square in Paco, Manila, bounded by Quirino Avenue to the east, and the rest of the plaza surrounded by the Plaza Dilao Road and Quirino Avenue Extension. The former site of a Spanish colonial era Japanese settlement, it prominently features a memorial commemorating Japanese Roman Catholic kirishitan daimyō Dom Justo Takayama, who settled there in 1615. It is one of two open public spaces in Paco, the other being Paco Park.

Currently, Plaza Dilao is one of five freedom parks in the City of Manila, where protests and rallies may be held without requiring permission from local authorities.

History
In Spanish colonial times, Paco (originally Dilao) was home to one of two Japanese settlements in Manila, with the other located in San Miguel.  While the Japanese community of Plaza Dilao began with Dom Justo Takayama and his family settling in the surrounding area after they were exiled from Japan in 1615, most Japanese in Manila at the time were settled around the area now occupied by the Philippine Normal University.  However, in 1762, the Japanese residents of Manila were later relocated here by the Spanish authorities, although after then the community's population began to decline owing to reduced Japanese immigration to the Philippines and Japan's policy of sakoku.  It is believed that the presence of the Japanese community around the plaza eventually led it to being called "Plaza Dilao", referring to the yellowish (dilaw in Tagalog) skin tone of the area's inhabitants.

During the American period, Plaza Dilao became a transport center with the construction of the Paco railway station in 1915, directly across from the plaza.  During World War II, the area was the site of an intense battle between Japanese and joint Filipino and American forces led by Cleto Rodriguez.  The plaza is still considered a transport center today: when former President Joseph Estrada became Mayor of Manila in 2013, he ordered a ban on city buses entering Manila, with buses for a while terminating at the plaza instead of their usual terminus at the Liwasang Bonifacio.

Surrounding buildings and structures
Aside from the Paco railway station, two prominent organizations in the Philippines are headquartered in the immediate vicinity of Plaza Dilao. The Philippine Columbian Association (PCA), the Philippines' oldest sporting club, relocated its headquarters to the plaza on April 1, 1979, while the Asociación de Damas de Filipinas (Ladies' Association of the Philippines) is located close to the plaza along Quirino Avenue Extension, having been located in the same place since its establishment in 1913. The Paco substation of Meralco, a part of the Sucat–Paco–Araneta–Balintawak Transmission Line of National Grid Corporation of the Philippines (NGCP), is located west of the plaza. The southbound off-ramp of Skyway Stage 3's Plaza Dilao Exit is being currently being constructed around the plaza, particularly along Plaza Dilao Road.

References

Dilao
Buildings and structures in Paco, Manila
Landmarks in the Philippines